Luis Roberto Barranzuela Vite (born 18 November 1962), is a Peruvian lawyer and former Minister of the Interior of Peru.

Minister of the Interior
On 6 October 2021, Barranzuela was appointed Minister of the Interior of Peru in the Pedro Castillo government.

References

Living people
1962 births
Government ministers of Peru
21st-century Peruvian politicians
University of San Martín de Porres alumni